Wu Wenhui (born April 27, 1998) is a Chinese female acrobatic gymnast. Along with her partner, Shen Yunyun, she finished 5th in the 2014 Acrobatic Gymnastics World Championships.

References

1991 births
Living people
Chinese acrobatic gymnasts
Female acrobatic gymnasts